Charles Tuaau (born January 4, 1992) is a former American football defensive tackle. He played for the Kansas City Chiefs and Miami Dolphins of the National Football League (NFL) after he went undrafted in the 2015 NFL Draft. He also played for the IBM Big Blue of Japan's X-League.

The native of Hawaii played college football at two junior colleges in California, Pasadena City College and Riverside City College, before transferring to Texas A&M University–Commerce, where he earned All-American honors.

Playing career

High school 
Tuaau attended and played football at Leilehua High School in his native Wahiawa, Hawaii. He signed a letter of intent with the University of Hawaii after completing high school, but instead enrolled at Pasadena City College (PCC), a California junior college, in 2011.

College 
In 2011, Tuaau played football for PCC, and during his freshman season he recorded 45 tackles, including 17 tackles for loss and 5 sacks, and led the team with 7 quarterback hurries. He was named to the SCFA All-National Southern Conference First-team.

After his 2011 season at PCC, he transferred to Riverside City College for his sophomore season in 2012. He accumulated 48 tackles and 9 sacks during the 2012 season.

In February 2013, Tuaau signed with Oregon State University, although he failed to meet its academic requirements and ultimately transferred to Texas A&M University–Commerce instead. He immediately made a significant impact during his first season at A&M–Commerce in 2013: he tallied 59 tackles, 25 tackles for loss, and 12.5 sacks in his first season, setting school season records for sacks (12.5) and tackles for loss (25), as well as the record for tackles for loss in a single game (5). He also earned Lone Star Conference Defensive Player of the Year and Defensive Lineman of the Year honors and was named to the AFCA All-America first-team and Daktronics All-America second-team in 2013.

Prior to the 2014 season, Tuaau was named a preseason Division II All-American by Beyond Sports Network. He also gained attention from NFL scouts, as College Football 24/7 writer Mike Huguenin praised his "disruptive nature" and opined that his 2013 statistics were "staggering numbers for a nose tackle".

In his senior season in 2014, Tuaau amassed 27 tackles, including 14 unassisted tackles, 9 tackles for loss, and 4.5 sacks. He was selected as a Cliff Harris Award finalist as one of the nation's most outstanding defensive players at a "small college", and also helped lead A&M–Commerce to the 2014 Lone Star Conference championship.

Tuaau finished his two-year career at A&M–Commerce with 86 tackles, including 45 solo tackles, 34 tackles for loss, and 17 sacks. D2Football.com placed him 23rd on its list of the Top 100 NCAA Division II prospects available in the 2015 NFL Draft.

Career statistics at A&M–Commerce

Source:

Kansas City Chiefs
After going undrafted in the 2015 NFL Draft, Tuaau signed with the Kansas City Chiefs on May 15, 2015. Because his May 2015 graduation ceremony fell on the same weekend that he was due to report to minicamp with the Chiefs, A&M–Commerce organized a special commencement ceremony for him. His wife, mother, and grandmother were all present as he became the first person in his family to earn a college degree. On August 24, 2015, the Chiefs experimented with moving him to the offensive line in practice, in what offensive coordinator Doug Pederson viewed as a learning experience for Tuaau. Pederson noted that Tuaau is "big, physical...powerful" and that he "fits that offensive line mode". However, he was cut by Kansas City on August 30, along with ten other players in the team's first round of cuts.

Miami Dolphins
Tuaau signed a reserve/future contract with the Miami Dolphins on January 14, 2016. On June 16, 2016, Tuaau was cut by Miami.

IBM Big Blue
In August 2017, Tuaau signed a contract to play for IBM Big Blue of the X-League in Japan.

St. Louis BattleHawks
Tuaau signed with the St. Louis BattleHawks of the XFL during mini-camp in December 2019. He was waived during final roster cuts on January 22, 2020.

References

External links

1992 births
Living people
Players of American football from Hawaii
American people of Polynesian descent
American football defensive tackles
Pasadena City Lancers football players
Riverside City Tigers football players
Texas A&M–Commerce Lions football players
Kansas City Chiefs players
Miami Dolphins players
St. Louis BattleHawks players
American expatriate sportspeople in Japan
American expatriate players of American football